Small Victory is a 1958 television play broadcast by the Australian Broadcasting Corporation. It was set during the Korean War. It was directed by William Sterling and was shot in Melbourne where it aired 26 March 1958.

It was based on a play by Australian author Iain MacCormick. The ABC later broadcast Sound of Thunder and Act of Violence (1959) by MacCormick. Australian TV drama at the time would customarily consist of adaptations of stories that had been tried overseas.

Plot
During the Korean War a group of people are trapped by North Korean troops at the Mission School of the Sacred Heart, including a priest, Father Riley, and a nun, Sister Annalissa. American war correspondent   Thompson helps   Korean orphan   Sophie sneak   into   the   Mission   School.

Cast
Beverly Dunn as Sister Annalissa
Brian James as Father Riley
Sydney Conabere as Thompson
Kira Daniels as Sophie
John Morgan as the political leader
Bettine Kaufman
Neville Thurgood as Sgt Little
Judith Godden
Laurier Lange
Kira Daniel
Tony Roberts

Production
BBC lighting expert W.R. Whitmore helped with the production  (he was in Australia giving lectures on lighting in Sydney and Melbourne). Whitmore had helped light the BBC version. James, Dunn and Morgan had just appeared in the TV play Gaslight.  It was one of a number of TV plays featuring Dunn.

Director Will Sterling borrowed a machine gun from the army.

Reception
According to The Age the production was "well received".

See also
List of live television plays broadcast on Australian Broadcasting Corporation (1950s)

References

External links

Australian television plays
1958 television plays
Australian Broadcasting Corporation original programming
English-language television shows
Australian live television shows
Black-and-white Australian television shows
Korean War films
Films directed by William Sterling (director)